G-Surfers is a futuristic racing game, originally scheduled to be released in Europe on September 28, 2001, by Midas Interactive Entertainment, before the game was delayed to January 25, 2002. The game is an exclusive to the PlayStation 2 console. On January 26, 2003 in the United States, it was released by Majesco Entertainment and slightly altered under the title HSX: Hypersonic.Xtreme. The game was influenced by F-Zero and the Wipeout video game series, resulting in a very similar game and very mixed reviews. The game was briefly shown in the 2008 film Meet Dave.

The game features 30 tracks and 15 crafts. While the first six races are available immediately, the player must complete the game to unlock more tutorials and tracks. It also features "TrakEdit", a mode allowing players to create their own tracks using various objects. Tutorials guide the player to this mode. A two-player split screen mode is included in the game, as well as the Time Trial and Cup racing modes for one player. The player should choose a craft they like to use in the game, and then go through five series (each including six tracks). The player must finish in first, second or third place to win. The player unlocks more material for successfully completing a series. The tracks incorporate twists, turns, loops, corkscrews, and jumps. The player must avoid obstacles and hazards such as falling off the track. In addition, there are boost and health icons throughout each track.

Reception

G-Surfers received "mixed" reviews according to the review aggregation website Metacritic. Edge gave the game a mixed review while it was still in development. IGNs Kaiser Hwang was more critical but felt that it is something "you've seen before." GameSpy gave it a negative review, saying that while the game "indisputably possesses both a real-time track system and instant functionality, the feature it needs the most is the one it doesn't have -- weapons." Hitting at ramps and damaging the craft was also criticized.

References

External links
 

2002 video games
Majesco Entertainment games
PlayStation 2 games
PlayStation 2-only games
Science fiction racing games
Video games developed in the United Kingdom